Mark Anthony Coffey (born 13 February 1990) is a Scottish professional wrestler currently signed to WWE, where he performs on the NXT  brand and is  currently one-half of the NXT Tag Team Champion with Wolfgang in their first reign. He is also a former NXT UK Heritage Cup and NXT UK Tag Team Champion.

Professional wrestling career

Early career (2010-2018) 
Coffey debuted as a wrestler for the independent promotion World Wide Wrestling League in 2010. He made his ICW match was at the ICW 1st Annual Square Go! Held in a battle royal on 21 January 2012. While at ICW, he won the ICW Tag Team Championship four times and the ICW Zero-G Championship three times. Prior to his arrangement with WWE, he wrestled for various other promotions including Pro Wrestling Elite, Target Wrestling and the Scottish Wrestling Alliance, winning a number of titles.

WWE (2018–present)

NXT UK (2018–2022)
Coffey would regularly appear on the NXT UK brand, being accompanied by his brother Joe Coffey in a winning effort on the first ever televised match on NXT UK. They would both go on to form the stable Gallus alongside Wolfgang and feud with British Strong Style.

On the 6 February 2019 episode of NXT UK, Coffey faced Walter in a losing effort in Walter's second match on NXT UK. On the 4 October episode of NXT UK, Mark and Wolfgang defeated previous champions Mark Andrews and Flash Morgan Webster for the NXT UK Tag Team Championship, going on to hold it for 497 days.

On the 14 July 2022 episode of NXT UK, Coffey defeated Noam Dar to become the new NXT UK Heritage Cup Champion. He would soon lose it back to Dar on the 25 August episode of NXT UK.

NXT (2022–present)
On NXT Heatwave, Gallus made their NXT 2.0  debut, attacking Diamond Mine. On August 23, 2022, Gallus made their tag team debut on NXT facing NXT UK Tag Team Champions Brooks Jensen and Josh Briggs, which they would go on to win via countout. At Worlds Collide, Gallus became the second team eliminated from the Fatal four-way tag team elimination match for the NXT and NXT UK Tag Team Championship. Gallus would go on to have a rivalry with Briggs and Jensen, with the latter winning a No Disqualification tag team match between the teams. Gallus were later suspended on September for attacking officials.

At New Year’s Evil on 10 January 2023, Gallus returned from their suspension and won a gauntlet match to become the #1 contenders for the NXT Tag Team Championship, which Coffey and Wolfgang won on Vengeance Day the month after.

Championships and accomplishments 
Insane Championship Wrestling
 ICW Zero-G Championship (3 times)
 ICW Tag Team Championship (4 times) – with Jackie Polo
Pro Wrestling Elite
 PWE Tag Team Championship (1 time) – with Jackie Polo
 Pro Wrestling Illustrated
 Ranked No. 178 of the top 500 singles wrestlers in the PWI 500 in 2019
Scottish Wrestling Alliance
 Scottish Heavyweight Championship (1 time)
 SWA Tag Team Championship (3 times) – with Jackie Polo (2) and Joe Coffey (1)
Target Wrestling
 Target Wrestling Tag Team Championship (1 time) – with Jackie Polo
World Wide Wrestling League
 W3L Tag Team Championship (1 time) – with Joe Coffey
 WWE
 NXT UK Heritage Cup (1 time)
NXT Tag Team Championship (1 time, current) – with Wolfgang
NXT UK Tag Team Championship (1 time) – with Wolfgang

References

External links
 
 
 
 

1990 births
21st-century professional wrestlers
Living people
NXT Tag Team Champions
NXT UK Tag Team Champions
Scottish male professional wrestlers
Sportspeople from Glasgow